The Gerber Baby is the trademark logo of the Gerber Products Company, an American purveyor of baby food and baby products. Drawn by artist Dorothy Hope Smith, the Gerber Baby was modeled after Ann Turner Cook (1926–2022).

History

Fremont Canning Company, owned and operated by Dan Gerber, was looking for a baby face for its new baby food campaign, which was to start in the later part of 1928. To find a baby face that it believed would best represent the new baby food, the Fremont Canning Company conducted a contest in the summer of 1928. Many drawings and paintings were submitted. Some were elaborate baby portraits in oil paint, while others were simple sketches.

Dorothy Hope Smith of Westport, Connecticut, an artist specialising in children’s drawings, submitted an unfinished charcoal drawing, that was closer to a simple sketch than a professional drawing. Smith told the judges that, if the sketch were selected as the winner, she would finish it professionally. The drawing won but, to her surprise, the judges wanted no changes to it.

In 1928, the “Gerber Baby” symbol was introduced to help identify the new product. It was first used in a baby food advertisement in the magazine Good Housekeeping. Within sixty days, Gerber Strained Foods, using the “Gerber Baby” symbol, had gained national recognition, being distributed to various places throughout the United States. It became internationally recognized.

The campaign encouraged mothers of newborns to participate directly in a coupon redemption program. The introductory offer gave each consumer six cans of the canning company’s soup and strained vegetables for a dollar in exchange for the name of a favorite grocer.

The idea was to stress the nutritional value of Gerber’s baby foods and the time and money saving advantages over buying by prescription. The sketch was so popular that it became the Fremont Canning Company’s official trademark in 1931. The Gerber Baby has since appeared on all Gerber packaging and in every Gerber advertisement. The Fremont Canning Company changed its name to Gerber Products Company in 1941.

The model for Smith's original sketch, Ann Turner Cook (1926–2022) grew up to be a mystery novelist and English teacher. Although she avoided publicity for many years, Cook more recently granted interviews to several Florida newspapers. In the beginning of 2011, the company was in the process of looking for the next Gerber Baby. It eventually chose a toddler named Mercy Townsend.

Earlier, one poll conducted in the United States showed that many people thought that the Gerber Baby became someone famous, such as Humphrey Bogart, Elizabeth Taylor, or Ernest Borgnine. The trademark of the Gerber Baby has been shown by the United States public to be associated with the highest consumer loyalty, according to one survey in 1998.

Of note, in the beginning of February 2018, Gerber selected a baby affected by Down Syndrome for its advertising campaign, and received praise and appreciation from many sources. In 2020, for the first time, Gerber chose an adopted baby as the face of their campaign. In 2022, Gerber chose a baby born with a limb difference, and matched the $25,000 cash prize with a donation to March of Dimes.

Gerber Baby Photo Contest winners

References

Sources

 Avakian, Arlene Voski et al., From Betty Crocker to Feminist Food Studies, Liverpool University Press (2005), 
 Belasco, Warren James, Food Nations, Routledge (2002), 
 Heim, Michael, Exploring America's Highways, Exploring America's Highway (2004), 
 Ingham, John N., Biographical Dictionary of American Business Leaders: A-G, Greenwood Publishing Group (1983), 

Corporate mascots
Female characters in advertising
Child characters in advertising
Mascots introduced in 1928
American logos